El Guindi (with many variant spellings in English) is an Egyptian surname from Classical Arabic al-jundi (الجندي) ("soldier").

People surnamed El Guindi  
 Abdel Moneim El-Guindi (fly-weight boxer)
 Ahmed El Guindi (director)
 Amina El-Guindi (politician)
 Fadwa El Guindi (anthropologist)
 Hosni Guindi (journalist)
 Karla Guindi (wife of Mexican actor Erick Elías)
 Mohamed El-Guindi (footballer)
 Nadia El Guindi aka El Gindy, El Gendy, Arabic: نادية الجندي (actress, producer)
 Youssef El Guindi (politician and leader in Zefta)
 Yussef El Guindi (playwright)

Fictional characters surnamed El Guindi
 Mahmoud El Guindi (Howa wa heya television drama)

Arabic-language surnames